NA-34 may refer to:

NA-34 (Karak), a constituency of the National Assembly of Pakistan
NA-34 (Lower Dir), a former constituency of the National Assembly of Pakistan
 Sodium-34 (Na-34 or 34Na), an isotope of sodium